The Berendrecht Lock is the world's second largest lock, providing access to the right-bank docks of the Port of Antwerp in Belgium.

Background
Post World War II, work started on the Grote Doorsteek, an ambitious plan which ultimately resulted in the extension of the Antwerp docks on the right bank of the Scheldt to the Netherlands border. In 1967, the company completed the construction of the Zandvliet Lock (Zandvlietsluis), then the world's largest lock.

Construction
In 1989, needing to accommodate wider Post-Panamax ship, the company built a new lock just to the south of the Zandvliet lock. Bascule bridges at the ends of each lock, (Zandvliet and Frederik-Hendrik bridges across the Zandlievet Lock; and Oudendijk and Berendrecht bridges across the Berendrecht Lock), allow full road traffic access around the port. The two locks now work as a doubled lock system.

Completion of the Berendrecht Lock allowed the extended development of the right bank docks complex, and later the creation of fast turnround tidal berths, both on the right bank (Europa Terminal and the North Sea Terminal), and on the left bank (the Deurganck Dock).

Dimensions
Length: 
Width: 
Operational Depth (TAW): 
Sill depth at mean high water: 
Lock Gates: four sliding gates

In both length and total volume (length×breadth×difference in water levels), the Berendrecht Lock is the second-largest in the world.

New left bank lock
In November 2011, work started on the Kieldrecht Lock that became in June 2016 the world's new largest lock on the left bank of the Scheldt.

See also
Louis Joubert Lock, Saint-Nazaire, France: Europe's largest dry dock

References

External links
PortofAntwerp.com

Buildings and structures in Antwerp
Locks of Belgium